The Candy Man is a 1969 American crime film directed by Herbert J. Leder and written by Herbert J. Leder. The film stars George Sanders, Leslie Parrish, Manolo Fábregas, Pixie Hopkin, Félix González and Pedro Galván. The film was released in February 1969, by Allied Artists Pictures.

Plot

Julia Evans, an American actress travels to Mexico with her young daughter.  Drug dealer Sidney Carter spots the pair and decides to kidnap the young child.  Carter enlists the services of his addict customer, Rick Pierce. The child's nanny, Greta, at first agrees to go along with the plot, but has second thoughts when the time comes. Greta attempts to fight off Pierce, but the young daughter is snatched by another woman. Carter approaches Evans with his ransom demands.  The police are called by Roger, Evans' manager, and her ex-husband Lee.  Officer Lieutenant Garcia tracks down the child after the ransom is paid, and confronts Carter.  After a chase Carter is cornered near a hotel window, and falls to his death during the struggle, and the daughter is saved.  Mother, father, and daughter are then reunited.

Cast       
 George Sanders as Sidney Carter
 Leslie Parrish as Julie Evans
 Manolo Fábregas as Lt. Garcia
 Pixie Hopkin as Maria Lopez
 Félix González as Felipe Lopez
 Pedro Galván as Roger West
 Gina Romand as Greta Hansen
 José Ángel Espinosa 'Ferrusquilla' as The Vagabond
 Nancy Rodman as Gwen Easterly
 Chuck Anderson as Lee Stevens
 Carlos Cortés as Rick Pierce
 John Kelly as Inspector
 Lupita Ferrat as Jenny Stevens

References

External links
 
 

1969 films
American crime films
1969 crime films
Allied Artists films
Films directed by Herbert J. Leder
1960s English-language films
1960s American films